Vesicle-associated membrane protein 3 is a protein that in humans is encoded by the VAMP3 gene.

Function 

Synaptobrevins/VAMPs, syntaxins, and the 25-kD synaptosomal-associated protein are the main components of a protein complex involved in the docking and/or fusion of synaptic vesicles with the presynaptic membrane. This gene is a member of the vesicle-associated membrane protein (VAMP)/synaptobrevin family. Because of its high homology to other known VAMPs, its broad tissue distribution, and its subcellular localization, the protein encoded by this gene was shown to be the human equivalent of the rodent cellubrevin. In platelets the protein resides on a compartment that is not mobilized to the plasma membrane on calcium or thrombin stimulation.

Interactions 

VAMP3 has been shown to interact with
 BCAP31,
 BVES,
 SNAP23,
 STX4,
 STX6.

References

Further reading